The men's 4 × 720 metres relay event at the 1972 European Athletics Indoor Championships was held on 12 March in Grenoble. Each athlete ran four laps of the 180 metres track.

Results

References

4 × 400 metres relay at the European Athletics Indoor Championships
Relay